Visby BBK is a women's basketball club in Visby, Sweden. The club was established in 1992 out of the Visby AIK basketball section. The women's team, playing as Visby Ladies, won the Swedish women's national basketball championship during the season of 2004–2005.

Tia Paschal played for the club during the 1997–1998 season.

References

External links
Visby BBK 
Visby Ladies' official website 

1992 establishments in Sweden
Basketball teams established in 1992
Women's basketball teams in Sweden
Sport in Visby